Unt is an Estonian surname, ultimately from an old Finno-Ugric topographic stem, and because of its abundance in place names throughout areas of Finno-Ugric speaking peoples, is believed to have meant something hydronymically essential. In many cases, the name may be a corruption of the Estonian word hunt, meaning "wolf", which is a rather common Estonian surname. 

As of 1 January 2021, 372 men and 414 women in Estonia have the surname Unt. Unt is ranked as the 110th most common surname for men in Estonia, and the 108th most common surname for Estonian women. The surname Unt is the most common in Valga County, where 21.79 per 10,000 inhabitants of the county bear the surname. 

Notable people bearing the surname Unt include:

Aime Unt (b. 1941), stage designer
Anto Unt (b. 1955), philosopher
Henn Unt (1903–1986), Lutheran clergyman
Jaan Unt (1894–1974), military lieutenant colonel
Jaan Unt (1947–2012), classical philologist, translator and literary scholar
Johan Unt (1876–1930), military major general 
Katariina Unt (b. 1971), actress
Kersti Unt (b. 1950), literary scholar and translator
Liina Unt (b. 1977), stage designer
Maksim Unt (1898–1941), politician
Marja Unt (b. 1982), literary scholar and translator
Mati Unt (1944–2005), writer, essayist and theatre director
Riho Unt (b. 1956), animated film director, screenwriter, artist
Väino Unt (1932–2015), physicist

References

Estonian-language surnames